The San Bartolome Apostol Parish Church (Saint Bartholomew, the Apostle Parish Church) is a Roman Catholic church in Nagcarlan, Laguna, Philippines. Its titular is St. Bartholomew and its feast day is celebrated every August 24.

History 
Nagcarlan was first colonized in 1571 by Juan de Salcedo, grandson of Miguel López de Legazpi. It was founded by Franciscan priests Juan de Plasencia and Diego Oropesa in 1578. The church of Nagcarlan was first built from light materials such as nipa and wood in 1583 under the chaplaincy of its first priest, Father Tomas de Miranda who also pioneered the cultivation of wheat in the country and was dedicated to Saint Bartholomew. During Father Cristobal Torres' term, a second church made of stone and bricks was built in 1752. The multicolored stones and bricks of the church were offered by the people during its construction. The church was partially destroyed by fire in 1781. Immediate repair and reconstruction was done under the term of Father Anatacio de Argobejo and later by Father Fernando de la Puebla, who built the four storey brick bell tower. Further reconstruction using adobe and restoration (including elaborately designed tiles) in 1845 and addition of the choir loft on three strong arches was done under the supervision of Father Vicente Velloc. The Nagcarlan Underground Cemetery was built also in 1845 and the church rectory in 1850 under Father Velloc. In the 1990s, Monsignor Jose Barrion led a huge restoration project for the church.

Features 
The tiered wall Nagcarlan church generally falls under the Baroque style. The design of the facade has a semicircular arched main entrance along with semicircular windows and tall pedestals and columns present also in the church's side entrance. The four storey brick bell tower has bells with the Franciscan coat of arms (crossed arms of Christ and St. Francis of Assisi) and Muslim inspired crenelations.

On popular culture 
The church was featured in the 1974 movie "Kampanerang Kuba" starring Vilma Santos and its teleserye remake, an ABS-CBN television series starring Anne Curtis in 2005.

See also 
 Nagcarlan Underground Cemetery

References

Bibliography

External links 

Roman Catholic churches in Laguna (province)
Marked Historical Structures of the Philippines
Roman Catholic churches completed in 1752
18th-century Roman Catholic church buildings in the Philippines
Churches in the Roman Catholic Diocese of San Pablo